Carl Georg Eduard Friederici (28 January 1866 – 15 April 1947) was a German ethnologist. He wrote extensively on the customs and language of peoples affected by European colonization in America and Oceania.

Life

Carl Georg Eduard Friederici was born on 28 January 1866 in Stettin. His father, Carl Friederici (1832–83), was a wine wholesaler. 
His mother was Emilie Schultze (1836–1901), daughter of a baker.
He made his career in the army, but from an early age was interested in the history and peoples of foreign lands.
In 1893–94 he took leave and traveled in Spain and North Africa.

Friederici was the military attaché at the German embassy in Washington from 1894 to 1895, and took the opportunity to travel through the United States, Cuba and Canada and to conduct research in the libraries of New York City and Washington, D.C.
His 1900 Indianer und Anglo-Amerikaner (Indians and Anglo-Americans) described the history and differences in treatment of the Indians in the United States and Canada.
A reviewer wrote, "The author shows close familiarity with the literature of the subject, and every statement is substantiated by authoritative reference."
In 1900 Friederici campaigned in China during the Boxer Rebellion.
He was a captain and company commander when he left the Prussian army in September 1903.
He then devoted himself to the study of ethnology, history and geography in Tübingen, Göttingen and Leipzig.
He received a PhD from Leipzig.

In 1908 the Imperial Colonial Office sent Friederici and Karl Sapper to the Pacific.
They studied the Bismarck Archipelago in 1908–09.
In 1909 Friederici was head of an expedition in German New Guinea and in the English and French possessions of the Pacific.
In 1909–10 he made another research trip to German and Dutch New Guinea.
He worked on his findings for several years, but was called back to military service with the outbreak of World War I (1914–18).
After being discharged he moved to Ahrensburg, Holstein where he built a large library on the history of exploration of America and Oceania.
He continued his studies until his death on 15 April 1947 in Ahrensburg.

Work

Friederici researched the history of exploration from old sources. He also undertook the comparative study of native languages, particularly those affected by European colonization.
He used his military knowledge in his many writings on weapons and war methods of foreign nations.
His publications included:

Notes

Sources

1866 births
1947 deaths
German ethnologists